Sesquimustard (military code Q) is the organosulfur compound with the formula . Although it is a colorless solid, impure samples are often brown.  The compound is a type of mustard gas, a vesicant used as a chemical weapon.  From the chemical perspective, the compound is both a thioether and an alkyl chloride.

Because sesquimustard is a solid at room temperature, it is not as easily deployed as related liquid mustards. It was only ever deployed as mixtures with the original mustard, with phosgene, or as a solution. Since 1997, it has been listed under Schedule I of the Chemical Weapons Convention, as a substance with few uses outside of chemical warfare (although since then, it has been found to be useful in chemotherapy).

See also
 Half mustard
 HN3 (nitrogen mustard)
 O-Mustard
 Selenium mustard

References

Sulfur mustards
Blister agents
Chloroethyl compounds